Sultan Alam Shah School or simply Alam Shah (abbreviated as SAS or SSAS; Malay: Sekolah Sultan Alam Shah) is a fully residential school situated in Putrajaya, Malaysia. Sultan Alam Shah School is one of the schools in the country awarded with the title High Performance School (Malay: Sekolah Berprestasi Tinggi) and in 2014 was entitled as one of the ten Schools of Global Excellence (SGE) (Malay: Sekolah Kecemerlangan Global) in Malaysia by the Ministry of Education due to its academic merits, brotherhood-ship of its alumnus, international recognition, broad network and vast linkages. The school is under the royal patronage of the Sultan of Selangor.

History

Establishment

Alam Shah School was introduced as a result of the Razak Report drafted in 1956, in line with the efforts of reforming the education system in the Federation of Malaya. The school was planned to be constructed alongside , but was delayed until 1961. Two years later, SAS began its operations on 7 February 1963 and was launched by the late Sultan of Selangor, Sultan Salahudin Abdul Aziz. During its inception, SAS became the first secondary Malay school in Malaya to enroll a batch of Form 6 students, which gave the opportunity for Malay students from the middle-class to further their studies both locally and abroad. The old school campus was located at Kampung Konggo (then Bandar Tun Razak), Cheras, Kuala Lumpur, where the Alam Shah Science Secondary School (ASiS) now resides.

Its first enrolment oversaw the intake of Form 4, Form 5 and Form 6 male students, as well as 8 female students in Lower Form 6. The trend of female intakes ended in 1974 as Sekolah Seri Puteri (SSP) had opened and started enrolling female students. During the same year, SAS started enrolling Form 1 students. SAS had also enrolled matriculation students from National University of Malaysia (UKM) from 1975 to 1998.

Transferring to Putrajaya

The idea of moving SAS from Cheras to Putrajaya had sparked from the aspiration of the fourth Prime Minister, Tun Dr Mahathir Mohamad to have an elite world-class school located in Malaysia’s new administrative capital, Putrajaya. The meeting between Mahathir and the former Secretary General of the Ministry of Finance,  had led to the realisation of this idea. A 24-hectare land was approved as the site for SAS’ new campus. Construction works started in early 2001, and ended on 26 April 2003. The school gradually shifted from the Cheras campus to Putrajaya to make way for the oncoming opening ceremony.

On 25 March 2006, a total of 652 students migrated to the new campus to witness the opening ceremony inaugurated by the current Sultan of Selangor, Sultan Sharafuddin Idris Shah, who also bestowed the name Sekolah Sultan Alam Shah to the school, which was based on the name of his grandfather, Sultan Hisamuddin Alam Shah.
A year later, on 30 March 2007, SAS was granted the title Cluster School of Excellence (Malay: Sekolah Kluster Kecemerlangan) by the former Minister of Education, Dato’ Sri Hishamuddin Hussin. SAS was also named as a High Performance School (Malay: Sekolah Berprestasi Tinggi) on 25 January 2011.

The celebration was visited by the sixth Prime Minister, Dato Seri Najib Abdul Razak, who donated RM1 million to the school at the time of celebration, former Deputy Minister of Education Dr Mohd Puad Zarkashi and former Director General of Education Tan Sri Ghafar Mahmud. The celebration included a gala night, marching formations, performance by multiple groups such as Alam Shah Wind Orchestra (ASWO) and Gamelan Tradisional SAS (GATRASAS), as well as gallery walks relating to the history and performance of the school. The celebration also oversaw the participation of international visitors.

Motto and Identity

Motto

SAS’ main motto is enshrined on its blazonry, which is ‘Chita, Usaha, Jaya’ (Aspire, Strive and Succeed). Other mottos include ‘SAS: Good to Great, Great to Exceptional’.

Blazonry

The logo consists of a red “Old French” escutcheon (shield) with yellow per bend sinister motive. A blue circle with the crescent and the 14-pointed Federal Star (Bintang Persekutuan) is located in the middle of the shield. Above the circle lies a glaring red flame of a torch. Below the circle, an opened book is placed. Located below the book is a small blue banderole bearing the motto of the school ‘Chita Usaha Jaya’. 

Below the shield, a simple black compartment is added and a blue banderole containing the words “Sultan Alam Shah Putrajaya”, denoting the school’s name, is included. 

Each element bears their own meaning, which include:
 Torch – Education and Support
 Book – Knowledge
 Star and Crescent – The Country, Islam and the National Principles (Rukun Negara)
 Yellow – Cautious
 Blue – Calmness 
 White – Pureness 
 Red – Bravery

Flag

The flag is a simple dark blue field with the school’s blazonry in the middle. The blue field represents unity and calmness, while the middle position of the blazonry indicates the thorough acceptance of education.

Official Anthem

The official anthem for SAS is ‘Alam Shah Jaya’ (English: Victorious Alam Shah). It was composed and lyricised by Oscar H. Batoebara, an Indonesian teacher.

Organisation

List of Principals

Academics

SAS provides education ranging from the fields of Science and Mathematics (Science, Physics, Biology, Chemistry, Mathematics, Additional Mathematics), Technic and Vocational (Visual Arts, Music, Basic Computer Science, Design and Technology), Language (Malay, English, Arabic, Mandarin, Japanese, French, Korean) as well as Humanities (History, Geography, Physical and Health, Islamic Education).

Sport Houses 

In SAS, students are assigned to either one of the six sports houses, and are entitled to contribute to the house not only in sports, but also in co-curricular activities, academic performance and discipline. In each sport house, a leader called the ‘house captain’ (kapten rumah) is appointed by popular vote, and the ‘head of house teachers’ (ketua guru rumah) is chosen among teachers of respective sport houses to oversee the activities within the sport house.

List of Sports Houses

Traditions

Throughout its existence, SAS has developed its own niche that stands out from most schools in Malaysia.
 
Dress Code

SAS implements school uniforms with a white shirt and grey or black trousers, making it unique compared to other secondary school students in Malaysia, who only wear the conventional olive green trousers. Additionally, a grey or black blazer is put on during Mondays.

For Wednesdays, it is partially mandatory to wear uniform body attire, and a Batik or corporate shirt is worn interchangeably on Thursdays depending on which week it is on. On Fridays, a white Baju Melayu with a Songkok and Sampin is put on.

ASAS Old Boys’ Weekend (OBW)

ASAS OBW is an annual gathering event among the alumni of SAS as an act of paying homage and strengthening brotherhood-ship between former students. Usually, student batches that have left SAS 10 and 25 years ago from the current year are given the privilege to host the event.

Co-curricular Activities

Rugby

The school rugby team is one of the pioneers in Malaysian youth and grassroots rugby which had successfully produced many accomplished rugby players nationwide. The school team participated in the Super Six Schools Rugby Tournament. The tournament is held among traditional rivals of the game which made up of the best rugby playing schools in Malaysia – Malay College Kuala Kangsar (MCKK), Sekolah Tuanku Abd Rahman (STAR) Ipoh, Sekolah Dato Abd Razak (SDAR) in Seremban, Sekolah Sultan Alam Shah (SAS) in Putrajaya, Sekolah Menengah Sains Selangor (SMSS) and Sekolah Menengah Sains Hulu Selangor (SEMASHUR).

Basketball

SAS basketball team is always one of the key title contenders for the Hari Kecemerlangan Sekolah Berasrama Penuh basketball competition, consistently being in the final/national rounds and winning twice throughout the history of the competition.        

Debate

SAS is also well known for the eloquence of its debate team, be it Bahasa Melayu or English debate teams.  SAS debaters have won numerous accolades at the national and international level for their impeccable oratory skills.  The debate teams are also a permanent feature at the advanced stages of HKSBP debate competition every year, challenging for the titles and winning them on several occasions.     

Others 

In athletics and other sports like football, golf, chess and badminton, Sekolah Sultan Alam Shah have good participation in Majlis Sukan Sekolah-Sekolah Malaysia (MSSM) events every year.Alam Shah Hockey Association (ASHOC) also participated in tournaments such as HKSBP and MSSWP. Some of the students earned places to represent the state of Selangor (2006 and before) and Putrajaya (2007 onwards).

Notes

References

External links 

 
 https://web.archive.org/web/20080905093838/http://jiwef.org/english/intro/sub_05_07.php

1963 establishments in Malaysia
Educational institutions established in 1963
Boys' schools in Malaysia
Schools in Putrajaya